"Please Don't Go" is a song written by Harry Wayne Casey and Richard Finch, then members of KC and the Sunshine Band, and released as the second single from the band's sixth album, Do You Wanna Go Party (1979). Cover versions of the song that reached the top songs charts were recorded by Double You (1992), KWS (1992), and Basshunter (2008).

Original version
Originally written in the key of D flat, the song was the band's first sentimental ballad. In the song, the subject pleads for a second chance. Shortly after the song's one-week run at number one, the group broke up and Harry Wayne Casey began a solo career.

The song was part of a double-sided single; the flip slide "I Betcha Didn't Know That" was released to R&B stations and reached number 25 on the R&B chart.

Chart performance
The song was the first No. 1 hit of the 1980s on the Billboard Hot 100. It was also an international chart hit, reaching No. 1 in Australia and Canada and charting in Belgium (No. 8), West Germany (No. 20), Ireland (No. 5), the Netherlands (No. 7), New Zealand (No. 3), Norway (No. 4) and the UK (No. 3).

The song was a number-one hit on the Australian ARIA Charts, the band's sixth and final number-one hit in Canada on the RPM national chart as well as their fifth and final number-one hit on the US Billboard Hot 100 chart.

Charts

Weekly charts

Year-end charts

All-time charts

Certifications

Double You version

Italian Eurodance group Double You recorded a cover version of "Please Don't Go" in 1992. Produced by Roberto Zanetti, the song was released in January, earning multiple gold and platinum status and becoming a hit in Europe, Latin America, Africa and Asia. The record was also moderately successful in North America (top ten maxi sales), Israel (#12) and in the UK (#2 on the Cool Cuts Chart).

Double You's version of "Please Don't Go" was later adopted as closing theme by Gianni Boncompagni for his TV Show Non è la RAI in 1992. 

In 2005, Double You released "Please Don't Go 2005" on Triple B Records in collaboration with artist Don Cartel. The single hit the Dutch Mega Top 100 chart at No. 40 and the Pepsi Chart at No. 38.

Track listings

 CD maxi
 "Please Don't Go" (radio mix) – 3:18
 "Please Don't Go" (club mix) – 6:14
 "Please Don't Go" (let's go mix) – 3:31
 "Please Don't Go" (a cappella) – 3:18

 7" single
 "Please Don't Go" (radio mix) – 3:18
 "Please Don't Go" (a cappella) – 3:18

 7" single – France
 "Please Don't Go" (radio mix) – 3:18
 "Please Don't Go" (let's go mix) – 3:31

 12" maxi – Germany, Italy, Spain, US
 "Please Don't Go" (club mix) – 6:14
 "Please Don't Go" (radio mix) – 3:18
 "Please Don't Go" (let's go mix) – 3:31
 "Please Don't Go" (a cappella) – 3:18

 12" maxi – France
 "Please Don't Go" (club mix) – 6:14
 "Please Don't Go" (let's go mix) – 3:31

 CD maxi / 12" maxi – Remixes
 "Please Don't Go" (herbie remix) – 5:20
 "Organ Dream" – 2:15
 "Please Don't Go" (underground mix) – 4:55
 "Please Don't Go" (dub go) – 1:45

 CD maxi / 12" maxi – Techno remixes
 "Please Don't Go" (U.S.-rave mix) – 6:00
 "Please Don't Go" (UK-break mix) – 5:00
 "Please Don't Go" (euro-house mix) – 4:55

Charts

Weekly charts

Year-end charts

Certifications

KWS version

A sound-alike cover of Double You's arrangement was released as the debut single by the British group KWS and hit number one on the UK Singles Chart for five weeks in May 1992 and reached number six on the US Billboard Hot 100 in October that year. In Germany, the song reached No. 7 but disappeared out of the German Singles Chart the following week due to legal issues with Double You, who covered the song before. Due to this fall, "Please Don't Go" is the song with the highest position that dropped out of the country's singles chart the following week.

It was recorded and released after record company Network Records failed to secure UK distribution rights for the Double You version. KWS band member Chris King heard the Double You version in a club in early 1992, and, bringing together the other KWS members to form the band, decided to cover it "like the Love Affair covered Robert Knight's 'Everlasting Love' or David Parton covered Stevie Wonder's 'Isn't She Lovely'." The similarity between the versions resulted in Network paying compensation to Roberto Zanetti, Double You's producer, following three years of legal action.

The KWS version was dedicated in honour of Nottingham Forest (European football) defender Des Walker, who was on the verge of signing for Italian team Sampdoria. It was also a double A-side with "Game Boy"; King recalled: "We wanted something new and Game Boy was my son's favourite games console at the time. There were various mixes on the 12-inch single with silly names like "Afternoon of the Rhino", which had been the title of a northern soul single by Mike Post."

Release
The single was featured in a news story by a local TV station in Nottingham, the UK. BBC Radio 1 soon made it "Record of the Week" and it climbed from number 30 in the UK Singles Chart to number nine and then in its third week to number one, which is when the group first performed it on Top of the Pops. They performed it five times on the show, one week upsetting Elton John by using Dressing Room 1, relegating John to Dressing Room 2. 

During the time that the song was number one on the UK Singles Chart, SL2's "On a Ragga Tip", Guns N' Roses' "Knockin' on Heaven's Door", Shut Up & Dance's "Raving I'm Raving" and Kris Kross' "Jump" were number two.

The song was certified gold by the British Phonographic Industry.

After the song reached 500,000 sales in the UK, the Nottinghamshire County Council honoured KWS with a civic reception.

Critical reception
Joseph McCombs of AllMusic was mixed in his retrospective assessment of the KWS cover, writing that: "The bright vocals, synth bleeps, and predictable house groove that drove 'Please Don't Go' to the top of the charts wear thin quickly." Larry Flick from Billboard described the song as a "house-induced cover" and noted further that the beats "are hard enough to fill dancefloors, but are brightened by radio-friendly vocals and slick synths." Amy Linden from Entertainment Weekly gave it an B–, adding that the song "is loaded with Hi-NRG beats, shake-your-groove-thing vibes, and a couple of originals straight out of Saturday Night Fever. All you need are the disco ball and a white suit."  

In 2017, BuzzFeed listed the song at number 52 in their list of "The 101 Greatest Dance Songs Of the '90s".

Tom Ewing of Freaky Trigger wrote in his 3/10 review of the cover: "It's hard to muster much love for 'Please Don’t Go' – a barely adequate trot through a good song" and "It's a good example, though, of one of the nineties least-regarded, most revival-immune style, the generic dance cover version. [...] 'Please Don’t Go' isn't quite as deathly as the king of the dance cover version, Undercover's formica take on 'Baker Street', but it’s never memorable. That this nullity got five weeks at the top [of the UK charts] says more about the immobile singles chart than any double-digit run." Ewing considers "Game Boy", the other song in the double A-side release, to be as close as the UK Singles Chart came to a hardcore number one, but nonetheless concedes that: "As 'ardkore goes, it's poor, a collection of five years of weary dance tropes in search of even one good hook – Beltram-style hoover noises, house piano, cut-up vocal samples, a dubby bassline, none of them sticking around long enough to make an impact."

Track listings
 CD maxi
 "Please Don't Go" (Summer Mix) – 3:40
 "Please Don't Go" (Instrumental Surf) – 6:09
 "Game Boy" – 3:23
 "Kollision" – 4:12

Charts

Weekly charts

Year-end charts

Decade-end charts

Certifications

Basshunter version

In 2008 "Please Don't Go" was covered by Swedish musician Basshunter. The dance music song lasts two minutes and 58 seconds. It was produced by Basshunter, Robert Uhlmann and Scott Simons. "Please Don't Go" was released by Warner Music Sweden on May 19, 2008. On July 14 it was released as number three on Basshunter's third studio album Now You're Gone – The Album.

The song was originally planned to be released in the United Kingdom as the second single from Now You're Gone – The Album on June 23, 2008. However, the release was cancelled due to technical difficulties and "All I Ever Wanted" took its place on June 30. It had much more success than originally thought as the single reached number 2 in the UK charts. However, despite rumours that this would be the third single in the United Kingdom, "Angel in the Night" was released instead and was premiered on BBC Radio 1 on August 22, 2008, during Scott Mills's "Friday Floor Fillers".

Priya Elan from The Guardian described the single as europop. Editor of Popjustice compared "Please Don't Go" to "Now You're Gone" but with all the fun and spontaneity reduced to a joyless and attempt to quickly capitalise on its predecessor's success. In 2009 "Please Don't Go" was called number 43 of The 50 Worst Songs of the '00s by The Village Voice. Maura Johnston said that it stitches together the undeterred stomp of Gary Glitter's "Rock And Roll Part 2" and the keyboards of L.A. Style's "James Brown Is Dead". "Please Don't Go" debuted at number 39 on May 29, 2008 and after two weeks reached number six on Swedish singles chart. It also charted on Slovak airplay chart.

Track listing

Charts

Release history

See also
List of Billboard Hot 100 number ones of 1980

References

1970s ballads
1979 songs
1979 singles
1992 debut singles
2008 singles
KC and the Sunshine Band songs
Basshunter songs
Billboard Hot 100 number-one singles
Double You songs
Dutch Top 40 number-one singles
KWS (band) songs
Number-one singles in Australia
Number-one singles in Israel
Number-one singles in South Africa
Number-one singles in Spain
Rhythm and blues ballads
RPM Top Singles number-one singles
Songs about parting
Song recordings produced by Basshunter
Songs written by Harry Wayne Casey
Songs written by Richard Finch (musician)
Soul ballads
TK Records singles
Ultratop 50 Singles (Flanders) number-one singles
UK Singles Chart number-one singles
ZYX Music singles